Kepler is an opera by Philip Glass set to a libretto in German and Latin by Martina Winkel. It premiered on 20 September 2009 at the Landestheater in the Austrian city of Linz with Dennis Russell Davies conducting the Bruckner Orchestra. Its libretto is based on the life and work of Johannes Kepler, the 16th and 17th century mathematician and astronomer. The work was commissioned by the Linz Landestheater and Linz09 (a programme celebrating the city's designation as a European Capital of Culture). The opera was performed in the USA for the first time in May 2012 at the Spoleto Festival USA; it was conducted by John Kennedy and directed by Sam Helfrich, featuring an English translation by Saskia M. Wesnigk-Wood.

This is the third opera by Glass to be inspired by a physicist, after Einstein on the Beach (1976) and Galileo Galilei (2002).

Synopsis

"Fragments from the life and ideas of the scientist Johannes Kepler are contrasted with segments from the story of creation and poems by Andreas Gryphius, which portray Europe during the Thirty Years War."

Act 1 
 Prologue
 I.   Questions 1
 II.   Polyeder
 III.  Genesis 
 IV.  Gryphius —Auf die Nacht (Upon the Night)
 V.   Physica Coelestis
 VI.  Gryphius 2
 VII.  Questions 2
 VIII.  Gryphius 3—Eyes. Optical Paradox

Act 2 
 I.   On Astrology
 II.  Gryphius 4—To the Stars
 III.  Hypotheses
 IV.  Gryphius 5:—Tears of the Fatherland
 V.   Ephemerides
     Epilogue

References

Sources
 
 
 
 
 

2009 operas
German-language operas
Opera
Latin-language operas
Minimalist operas
Operas
Operas set in the 17th century
Operas based on real people
Operas set in Germany
Operas by Philip Glass